Gus McGinnis (August, 1870 – April 20, 1904) was a pitcher in Major League Baseball. He played for the Chicago Colts and Philadelphia Phillies.

External links

1870 births
1904 deaths
Major League Baseball pitchers
Chicago Colts players
Philadelphia Phillies players
New Orleans Pelicans (baseball) players
19th-century baseball players
Baseball players from Ohio
Marinette (minor league baseball) players
Helena (minor league baseball) players
Seattle Hustlers players
Erie Blackbirds players
Buffalo Bisons (minor league) players
Warren (minor league baseball) players
Paterson Weavers players
Allentown Peanuts players
People from Barnesville, Ohio